Sir James Chadwick Dunkerley (born 15 August 1953) OBE is Professor of Politics at Queen Mary, University of London, and the former Director of the Institute for the Study of the Americas and the Institute of Latin American Studies of the University of London.  He has written extensively on Bolivia, Central America, and elsewhere in Latin America.

Dunkerley was appointed Officer of the Order of the British Empire (OBE) in the 2010 Birthday Honours.

Publications 

 The Long War. Dictatorship and Revolution in El Salvador. London: Junction Books, 1982. 
 Rebellion in the Veins. Political Struggle in Bolivia, 1952-1982. London: Verso, 1984.
 Orígenes del Poder Militar en Bolivia. Historia del Ejército, 1879-1935. La Paz: Quipus Editores/Plural, 1987/2003.
 Power in the Isthmus. A Political History of Modern Central America. London: Verso, 1988.
 Political Suicide in Latin America and Other Essays. London: Verso, 1992.
 The Pacification of Central America. Political Change in the Isthmus, 1987-93. London: Verso, 1994.
 
 (co-edited with Victor Bulmer-Thomas), The United States and Latin America. The New Agenda. ILAS, The David Rockefeller Center for Latin American Studies, and Harvard UP, 1999.
 Americana: The Americas in the World, around 1850. London: Verso, 2000.
 Warriors and Scribes: Essays on the History and Politics of Latin America. London: Verso, 2000.

Footnotes

External links 
 Profile in Queen Mary, University of London
 Interview at Making History Project

Latin Americanists
Historians of Latin America
Academics of Queen Mary University of London
Living people
Officers of the Order of the British Empire
1953 births